Füchse Berlin is a professional handball club from Berlin, Germany, that currently competes in the Handball-Bundesliga, the highest national league, and in EHF competitions.

History
Until 2005, the club was organized as handball department of Reinickendorfer Füchse. For the 2005–06 season, the branding was changed to Füchse Berlin, in an effort to establish the club as a leading sports team of Berlin alongside Hertha BSC (football), Eisbären Berlin (ice hockey) and Alba Berlin (basketball). This coincided with the move to Max-Schmeling-Halle (Berlin's second biggest indoor sports venue), which is dubbed Fuchsbau (burrow in English). In 2007, the Füchse secured the championship in the Zweite Handball-Bundeliga, the second highest German league, thus advancing to Handball-Bundesliga, which the club has stayed in ever since. In 2014 the team won the DHB-Pokal, its first major trophy by defeating SG Flensburg-Handewitt 22—21.

Crest, colours, supporters

Kit manufacturers

Kits

Sports Hall information

Name: – Max-Schmeling-Halle
City: – Berlin
Capacity: – 8500
Address: – Am Falkpl. 1, 10437 Berlin, Germany

Team

Current squad
Squad for the 2022–23 season

Technical staff
 Head coach:  Jaron Siewert
 Assistant coach:  Maximilian Rinderle
 Goalkeeping coach:  Dejan Perić
 Athletic Trainer:  Carsten Köhrbrück
 Physiotherapist:  Tim Schilling
 Club doctor:  Sebastian Bierke

Transfers
Transfers for the 2023–24 season

Joining 
  Jerry Tollbring (LW) (from  GOG Håndbold) 
  Hákun West Av Teigum (RW) (from  Skanderborg Aarhus Håndbold)

Leaving 
  Miloš Vujović (LW) (to ?) 
  Hans Lindberg (RW) (to ?)

Previous squads

Accomplishments

Domestic
DHB-Pokal:
 : 2014
DHB-Supercup:
 : 2014

International
EHF Cup / EHF European League:
 : 2015, 2018
 : 2017, 2019, 2021
IHF Super Globe:
 : 2015, 2016
 : 2017, 2018

European record

EHF Cup and EHF European League

EHF ranking

Former club members

Notable former players

  Fabian Böhm (2010–2011)
  Sven-Sören Christophersen (2010–2014)
  Paul Drux (2011–)
  Simon Ernst (2018–2021)
  Steffen Fäth (2016–2018)
  Rico Göde (2008–2010)
  Silvio Heinevetter (2009–2020)
  Michael Krieter (2005)
  Marian Michalczik (2020–)
  Michael Müller (2019–2020)
  Carsten Ohle (2005–2008)
  Evgeni Pevnov (2011–2013, 2015)
  Markus Richwien (2006–2014)
  Christian Rose (2005–2006)
  Erik Schmidt (2017–2019)
  Frank Schumann (2006–2008)
  Bernd Seehase (1974–1979, 1983–1984)
  Johannes Sellin (2008–2013)
  Jens Vortmann (2005–2009)
  Fabian Wiede (2009–)
  Martin Ziemer (2019–2020)
  Konrad Wilczynski (2006–2011)
  Faruk Vražalić (2015–2016)
  Jakov Gojun (2015–2021)
  Marko Kopljar (2017–)
  Krešimir Kozina (2016–2017)
  Stipe Mandalinić (2017–2020)
  Ivan Ninčević (2010–2013)
  Zvonimir Serdarušić (1981–1984)
  Denis Špoljarić (2010–2017)
  Igor Vori (2022)
  Drago Vuković (2015–2018)
  Michal Brůna (2009)
  Pavel Horák (2013–2015)
  Pavel Prokopec (2005–2008)
  Petr Štochl (2006–2018)
  Lasse Andersson (2020–)
  Mathias Gidsel (2022–)
  Jacob Holm (2018–)
  Johan Koch (2018–)
  Torsten Laen (2009–2013)
  Hans Lindberg (2016–)
  Kasper Nielsen (2014)
  Hany El-Fakharany (2007–2009)
  Bjarki Már Elísson (2015–2019)
  Rúnar Kárason (2009–2011)
  Kohei Narita (2014–2015)
  Dainis Krištopāns (2020)
  Alexander Petersson (2010–2012)
  Andrius Stelmokas (2006–2008)
  Janko Božović (2007–2008)
  Miloš Vujović (2020–)
  Mark Bult (2007–2013)
  Børge Lund (2012–2013)
  Kjetil Strand (2007–2010)
  Kent Robin Tønnesen (2015–2017)
  Stian Vatne (2009–2011)
  Bartłomiej Jaszka (2007–2016)
  Michał Kubisztal (2007–2011)
  Konstantin Igropulo (2012–2015)
  Mark Ferjan (2015–2017)
  Ignacio Plaza Jiménez (2015–2018)
  Viran Morros (2021–2022)
  Iker Romero (2011–2015)
  Mijajlo Marsenić (2018–)
  Dejan Milosavljev (2019–)
  Draško Nenadić (2017)
  Petar Nenadić (2014–2017)
  Valter Chrintz (2020–)
  Max Darj (2022–)
  Jesper Nielsen (2013–2016)
  Fredrik Petersen (2013–2015)
  Jonathan Stenbäcken (2011–2012)
  Mattias Zachrisson (2013–2019)
  Wael Jallouz (2018)

Former coaches

See also
Sport in Berlin

References

External links
 Official website

German handball clubs
Handball-Bundesliga
Sport in Berlin
Handball clubs established in 1891
1891 establishments in Germany